"If He Ain't Gonna Love You" is a song recorded by American country music singer Jake Owen. Released on October 17, 2016, it is the second single from his fifth studio album for RCA Nashville, American Love. The song stalled on the charts at its peak of number 37 for several weeks, and became Owen's lowest-charting single of his career.

Content
The song is an R&B-influenced country song featuring backing vocals from Chris Stapleton, who co-wrote song with Shane McAnally and Luke Laird. It features "heavy bass and guitar", and is about a man pleading a woman to leave an unsatisfactory relationship in favor of starting one with him instead. Owen said that he chose to include Stapleton, who did not yet have a solo album at the time of the song's recording, after hearing him sing on demos, including the one for "If He Ain't Gonna Love You".

Critical reception
Billy Dukes of Taste of Country reviewed the single favorably, praising the "progressive production" while saying that the song is "an all-out jam that dares you not to dance." An article on the song in Rolling Stone called it " a sharp right turn from the laid-back beach vibe Owen's often associated with. It also reflects some of the angsty, battle-cry turmoil of his recent divorce."

Charts

References

2016 songs
2016 singles
Jake Owen songs
RCA Records Nashville singles
Songs written by Luke Laird
Songs written by Shane McAnally
Songs written by Chris Stapleton
Song recordings produced by Shane McAnally
Song recordings produced by Ross Copperman